Fürstenberg is a town in the Oberhavel district, Brandenburg, Germany.

Until 1919, Fürstenberg was part of the former Grand Duchy of Mecklenburg-Strelitz

Geography

The city lies at the southern edge of the Mecklenburg Lake District and is framed by the Röblinsee, Baalensee, and Schwedtsee lakes. The River Havel splits into several channels as it flows through the town, one of which contains a lock used by vessels navigating the river. The original town site was situated on an island between these channels.

Districts of Fürstenberg
Fürstenberg includes nine areas, named for former villages that are now mostly farmland or little more than a church:
 Altthymen
 Barsdorf
 Blumenow
 Bredereiche
 Himmelpfort
 Steinförde
 Ravensbrück
 Tornow
 Zootzen

Fürstenberg Palace 

North from the center of the city is Fürstenberg Palace, which was built between 1741 and 1752 by the architect Christoph Julius Löwe for Dorothea Sophie of Mecklenburg-Strelitz, the wife of Adolphus Frederick III, the Duke of Mecklenburg-Strelitz. In World War I and World War II, the palace was used as a hospital.

History 
In 1758, the Battle of Tornow was fought near the town between the forces of Prussia and Sweden during the Seven Years' War.

In the Nazi era, Fürstenberg was the site of Ravensbrück concentration camp. A memorial has been raised on the site.

Overrun by the Soviet Army in 1945, post-World War II they established the base of the 2nd Guards Tank Army of the Soviet Forces in Germany. In early 1959, three years before the Cuban Missile Crisis, the site was equipped with six R-5 Pobeda nuclear missiles, capable of launching from a mobile launcher from one of four tennis-court-sized sites capable of handling the larger R-12 Dvina. Similar sites were set up at Vogelsang, Zehdenick and Lychen (1xpad). After the withdrawal of the missiles in September 1959, the site returned to its original purpose as an army base.

Since the formation of the states (German Länder) in the GDR in 1990, Fürstenberg again belongs to the state of Brandenburg, and from 1993 became part of the newly formed district Oberhavel. The Russian Army troops were withdrawn from their former East German bases in 1994.

Demography

Transportation 

The town lies on the Berlin-Stralsund railway. The railway station is called Fürstenberg (Havel) and is serviced by DB Regio Nordost. The web site or vending machines of Verkehrsverbund Berlin-Brandenburg can be used to buy tickets.

Federal highway Bundesstraße 96 passes through town.

Notable residents

 Martin Blumner (1827-1901), composer, conductor and musical theorist
 Walter Bartel (1904-1992), resistance fighter and historian
Elsa Ehrich (1914–1948), Nazi SS concentration camp guard executed for war crimes
 Daniel Domscheit-Berg (1978–), technology activist.

Connected to Fürstenberg

 Heinrich Schliemann (1822-1890), archaeologist, 1836-1841 Apprentice in Fürstenberg
 Otto Hammann (1852-1928), lawyer and presser, died in Fürstenberg
 Oskar Minkowski (1858-1931), physician, died in Fürstenberg
 Semyon Konstantinovich Kurkotkin (1917-1990), Marshal of the Soviet Union, commander of the 2. Armored Army in Fürstenberg
 Daniel Domscheit-Berg (born 1978), former speaker of the Unveiling Platform WikiLeaks, lives in Fürstenberg

References

Gallery

External links

 Official site 

Localities in Oberhavel
Grand Duchy of Mecklenburg-Strelitz
Military facilities of the Soviet Union in Germany